Hans-Wilhelm Knobloch (18 March 1927, Schmalkalden – 10 July 2019) was a German mathematician, specializing in dynamical systems and control theory. Although the field of mathematical systems and control theory was already well-established in several other countries, Hans-Wilhelm Knobloch and Diederich Hinrichsen were the two mathematicians of most importance in establishing this field in Germany.

Education and career
After completing undergraduate study in mathematics from 1946 to 1950 at the University of Greifswald, he matriculated at the Humboldt University of Berlin, where he received his PhD in 1950. His thesis Über galoissche Algebren (On Galois algebras) was supervised by Helmut Hasse. After completing his doctorate, Knobloch, with the aid of a scholarship, followed Hasse to the University of Hamburg.

In 1952 and 1953 Knobloch held a teaching appointment at the University of Würzburg, after which he was offered a scholarship to complete his habilitation. After completing his habitation at the University of Würzburg in 1957, he was appointed to a substitute professorship in Münster. He held temporary academic posts at the Technical University of Munich, the University of Michigan from 1962 to 1963, and Denmark's Aarhus University from 1963 to 1965. From 1965 to 1970 he held a full professorship at the Technical University of Berlin. In 1970 at the University of Würzburg he accepted the professorial chair for control theory and dynamical systems, which he held until his retirement as professor emeritus in 1995.

In the 1950s Knobloch published several papers in algebra and number theory. In 1958 he published two papers in integral transforms and differential equations. By the 1960s he focused on differential equations and control theory. He made important contributions in the theory of the existence of periodic solutions of non-linear differential equations, the construction of integral manifolds for ordinary differential equations, and necessary higher-order conditions for optimal control problems. In 1983 he was an invited speaker at the International Congress of Mathematicians in Warsaw.

Knobloch was the author or co-author of several books and book chapters. His book on ordinary differential equations, co-authored with Franz Kappel, and his book linear control theory, co-authored with Huibert Kwakernaak, became standard textbooks in Germany. Knobloch promoted interdisciplinary cooperation with engineers and international cooperation among mathematicians. For the Oberwolfach workshops over many years he was one of the organizers, with Peter Sagirow, Manfred Thoma, and Huibert Kwakernaak, on the topic of control theory and, with Rolf Reissig, Jean Mawhin, and Klaus Schmitt, on the topic of ordinary differential equations. Knobloch played a key role in organizing the Equadiff conference held in Würzburg from 23 to 28 August in 1982.

Selected publications
  
 
 
 
  (over 100 citations)
 
 
 
 
 
 
 
  article in 2012 reprint

Books
  (1st edition 1974)
  (1st edition 1983)
  (pbk reprint of 1985 hbk 1st edition)

References

External links
 

1927 births
2019 deaths
20th-century German mathematicians
21st-century German mathematicians
Control theorists
Dynamical systems theorists
University of Greifswald alumni
Humboldt University of Berlin alumni
Academic staff of the University of Würzburg
People from Schmalkalden